Aspudden (Aspen cape) is a district of the Hägersten-Liljeholmen borough in Söderort, the southern suburban part of Stockholm.

Metro line 13 stops at Aspudden metro station.

See also 
Aspudden metro station
Geography of Stockholm

Districts of Stockholm